Panic of Girls Tour is the 2011 concert tour by the American new wave band Blondie, made as part of the support of their album Panic of Girls.

Background
Like the band's previous concert tour, the Endangered Species Tour 2010, this tour also promoted Panic of Girls.

The tour kicked on July 6 at the Optimus Alive! Festival in Portugal and visited Spain, the Netherlands, Ireland, the United Kingdom during the first leg and the United States and Canada during the second.

Set list 

The average setlist does not represent all of the shows of the tour. "D-Day" and "Mother" also opened the show on several occasions. "Rapture" also closed the show a few times, and "Heart of Glass" closed the show during one concert without an encore. The festival sets were usually shorter than the average sets, missing out several songs. The band was performing songs from different periods of their career and some covers, but the main part of the show are songs from their new album. Songs featured in several shows of the tour but not in the average setlist include the following-

From Blondie
 Rip Her To Shreds (performed as song 5 or 6 when it was performed)

From Parallel Lines
 Sunday Girl

Covers
Please Please Me (The Beatles cover)
 New Rose (The Damned cover)
 See No Evil (Television cover)
 You Can't Put Your Arms Around a Memory (Johnny Thunders cover) (this was near the end of the show when it was performed)
 I Don't Wanna Go Down To The Basement  (The Ramones cover) (this was performed near to the end of the main set when performed)
 Sharp Dressed Man (ZZ Top cover) (this was in the encore when it was performed)

Tour dates

Cancelled concerts

Personnel
Debbie Harry - vocals
Chris Stein - guitar
Clem Burke - drums, percussion
Leigh Foxx - bass
Matt Katz-Bohen - keyboards
Tommy Kessler - guitar

References

Blondie (band) concert tours
2011 concert tours